Vartika Jha (born 8 April 2000) is an Indian dancer, choreographer and actress. She was a contestant and runner-up in Star Plus's dance reality show Dance Plus (season 4) in 2018.

Personal life
Jha was born to Arvind Kumar Jha, an operator at Hindalco, Renusagar, and Kanta Jha on 8 April 2000 and was brought up in Sonbhadra, Uttar Pradesh. She born in a Hindu Brahmin family.

Career

After facing several rejections, Jha was selected on Dance Plus (season 4) in 2018, which aired on Star Plus. In the show, she reached at finals where she was the 2nd runner-up.

The Dance Plus's judge, choreographer, and Bollywood director Remo D'Souza cast Vartika in his film Street Dancer 3D along with Varun Dhawan and Shraddha Kapoor.

She then participated as a choreographer in Sony TV’s dance show India's Best Dancer (season 1), wherein Jha was the winning choreographer of the contestant Tiger Pop (Ajay Singh) who became the winner of India’s Best Dancer (season 1) in 2020.

In 2021, Vartika  choreographed the Super Dancer contestant, Sanchit Chanana, who became 2nd runner-up of the show in Sony TV’s dance show Super Dancer Chapter 4.

She then worked as a choreographer in Sony TV’s dance show India's Best Dancer (season 2), where Vartika was the winning choreographer of the contestant Saumya Kamble who became the winner of India’s Best Dancer (season 2) in 2022.

In 2022, Vartika became the captain of team Vartika in Zee TV's dance show DID Li'l Masters (Season 5) where she choreographed for all the contestants of team Vartika. Then, she worked as a choreographer in Zee TV's dance show DID Super Moms (Season 3), where Vartika was the winning choreographer of Varsha Bumra who became the winner of DID Super Moms (Season 3) in 2022.

Filmography

Films

Television

Music videos

References

External links
 
 
 

2000 births
Living people
Popping dancers
Hip hop dancers
Belly dancers
Indian female dancers
Indian women choreographers
Reality dancing competition contestants
Actresses in Hindi cinema
Actresses from Uttar Pradesh
Dancers from Uttar Pradesh
21st-century Indian actresses
21st-century Indian dancers